Argyrogrammana is a butterfly genus in the family Riodinidae. They are resident in the Neotropics.

Species list 
 Argyrogrammana alstonii (Smart, 1979) French Guiana, Trinidad and Tobago
 Argyrogrammana amalfreda (Staudinger, [1887]) Peru
 Argyrogrammana aparamilla Hall & Willmott, 1995 Ecuador
 Argyrogrammana barine (Staudinger, [1887]) Costa Rica, Colombia, Ecuador
 Argyrogrammana bonita Hall & Willmott, 1995 Ecuador
 Argyrogrammana caelestina Hall & Willmott, 1995 Colombia, Ecuador, Peru
 Argyrogrammana caesarion Lathy, 1958 Brazil
 Argyrogrammana celata Hall & Willmott, 1995 Ecuador
 Argyrogrammana chicomendesi Gallard, 1995 French Guiana
 Argyrogrammana crocea (Godman & Salvin, 1878) Costa Rica, Nicaragua, Panama, Ecuador
 Argyrogrammana denisi Gallard, 1995 French Guiana
 Argyrogrammana glaucopis (Bates, 1868) French Guiana, Ecuador, Peru, Brazil
 Argyrogrammana johannismarci Brévignon, 1995 French Guiana, Ecuador, Peru
 Argyrogrammana leptographia (Stichel, 1911) Costa Rica, Ecuador, Colombia
 Argyrogrammana natalita Hall & Willmott, 1995 Ecuador
 Argyrogrammana nurtia (Stichel, 1911) French Guiana, Bolivia, Peru
 Argyrogrammana occidentalis (Godman & Salvin, [1886]) French Guiana, Colombia, Trinidad and Tobago
 Argyrogrammana pacsa Hall & Willmott, 1998 Ecuador
 Argyrogrammana pastaza Hall & Willmott, 1996 Ecuador, Peru
 Argyrogrammana physis (Stichel, 1911) French Guiana, Colombia, Ecuador, Brazil, Peru
 Argyrogrammana placibilis (Stichel, 1910) French Guiana, Brazil, Peru
 Argyrogrammana praestigiosa (Stichel, 1929) French Guiana
 Argyrogrammana pulchra (Talbot, 1929) Colombia
 Argyrogrammana rameli (Stichle, 1930) French Guiana, Ecuador, Peru, Brazil
 Argyrogrammana saphirina (Staudinger, [1887]) Panama, Ecuador
 Argyrogrammana sebastiani Brévignon, 1995 French Guiana
 Argyrogrammana stilbe (Godart, [1824]) Mexico, French Guiana, Colombia, Bolivia, Ecuador, Brazil
 Argyrogrammana sticheli (Talbot, 1929) French Guiana
 Argyrogrammana subota (Hewitson, 1877) Ecuador
 Argyrogrammana sublimis Brévignon & Gallard, 1995 French Guiana, Costa Rica, Ecuador, Brazil
 Argyrogrammana talboti Brévignon & Gallard, 1998 French Guiana, Brazil
 Argyrogrammana trochilia (Westwood, 1851) French Guiana, Colombia, Bolivia
 Argyrogrammana venilia (Bates, 1868) French Guiana, Ecuador, Brazil

References
 Argyrogrammana at Markku Savela's website on Lepidoptera

Riodinidae of South America
Riodinidae
Butterfly genera
Taxa named by Embrik Strand